Aerobus may refer to:

 Aerobus, a self-propelled electrically powered bus-like suspended monorail vehicle
 a name for a bus line connecting an airport in some areas
 Checker Aerobus, a long limousine
 Mitsubishi Fuso Aero Bus, a series of heavy-duty intercity coaches
 VivaAerobús, a Mexican low-cost airline